Zulić is a surname. Notable people with the surname include:

Muhamed Zulić (1928–2008), Croatian politician
Nina Zulić (born 1995), Slovenian handball player
Samir Zulič (born 1966), Slovenian footballer

See also
 Zulick

Slavic-language surnames